Pádraigín Máire Ní Uallacháin is an Irish singer-songwriter, academic, and former newsreader from County Louth, Ireland.

Early life
Pádraigín Máire Ní Uallacháin was born into an Irish-speaking household in County Louth to Pádraig Ó hUallacháín and Eithne Devlin, originally from Cullyhanna, County Armagh. Her father, a teacher, writer and song collector collected older songs from the Oriel area and in Rannafast, and encouraged Pádraigín and her siblings to sing.

Pádraigín attended St Louis Secondary School, Mullaghmonaghan, County Monaghan before beginning a degree course at the University of Ulster.

Career

1976–1980: RTÉ and teaching

In August 1976, Pádraigín became a television newsreader at RTÉ, Ireland's national broadcaster. She also researched and presented numerous radio programmes in English and in Irish for RTÉ Radio.

Pádraigín left RTÉ in 1980 to become a school teacher in Athlone, County Westmeath.
She is a full-time professional musician since 1999.

1994–2004: Early recordings

In 1994, Pádraigín recorded her first full-length album with Garry Ó Briain. A Stór is a Stóirín was released on the acclaimed Gael Linn label and featured 36 songs for all ages, with an emphasis on songs suitable for primary school children.

Britain's Channel 4 commissioned music videos for a number of songs on the album, featuring dramatisations of the lyrics as well as performances from Pádraigín. The videos later became regular features on TnaG (Ireland's newly launched Irish language television channel) between 1996 and 1998. That same year, she also featured on the television programme Light, Darkness and Colour.

With the album's popularity growing, Pádraigín began the recording of her second album, again with Gael Linn. In 1995, Ní Uallacháin released An Dara Craiceann: Beanath the Surface. It featured unaccompanied sean-nós songs and songs set to music, including the works of Irish poet Nuala Ní Dhomhnaill.

Pádraigín's third album, When I Was Young, was a collaboration between Garry Ó Briain (with whom she had collaborated on her first album), and her husband, folk singer Len Graham, and was released on the Gael Linn label in 1999. Two years later, Pádraigín released fourth album, An Irish Lullaby: Suantraí, under the Shanachie label in the United States. The recording featured collaborations with Len Graham, Garry Ó Briain, Máire Breatnach, harpist Helen Davies, fiddler Nollaig Casey and Uilleann piper Ronan Browne.

2002–2010: A Hidden Ulster and new composition

The following year, Ní Uallacháin's book, A Hidden Ulster: People, songs and traditions of Oriel was published with Four Courts Press, featuring 540 pages of rare songs, their histories, biographies of authors, collectors and scribes and documentation of folk traditions in Oriel from the 17th century onwards. Television and radio programmes and series were produced, based on 'A Hidden Ulster' and featuring Ní Uallacháin on RTÉ Radio 1, TG4, RTÉ1 and on BBC radio. A Hidden Ulster was met with critical acclaim and featured in the Times Literary Supplement as a Book of the Year, and Irish Times Books of the Year list. After the book's publication in 2003, Pádraigín was awarded Gradam Shean-Nós Cois Life in 2003 for her contribution to the Irish song tradition, and became the first traditional artist to be awarded a Major Arts Award from the Arts Council of Northern Ireland.

In 2005, A Hidden Ulster was shortlisted for the 2005 Michaelis-Jena Ratcliff Prize in Folklore and Folklife. That same year, Pádraigín was named Traditional Singer in Residence at the Seamus Heaney Centre for Poetry at Queen's University Belfast.

In 2002, Ní Uallacháin released An Dealg Óir: The Golden Thorn. The track-list consisted mainly of songs from southeast Ulster, Oriel in particular. At the time, Pádraigín was studying the traditions, songs and people of the area. The album was again released on the Gael Linn label and features influential Irish musicians and singers, including Steve Cooney, Liam O'Flynn, Liam Ó Maonlaí and Máire Breatnach. Pádraigín appeared on The Highland Sessions on BBC Two/RTÉ One and performed Éalaigh Liom / Elope with Me from the album with harper Mary Ann Kennedy and programme creators Steve Cooney and Allan Macdonald.

Pádraigín released her sixth album, Áilleacht: Beauty in 2005. It is a collection of newly written and composed songs in Irish. Áilleacht garnered enthusiastic reviews and praise from both press and academics, with poet Louis de Paor stating:

Pádraigín performed songs from the album on BBC NI and RTÉ, alongside other performers to celebrate the publication of An Leabhar Mór: The Great Book of Gaelic, which was launched in Ireland and Scotland over a period of months in the countries' various cities. Pádraigín also contributed a song to the album that accompanied the book.

2011–2019: Songs of the Scribe and Oriel Arts Project

In November 2011, Pádraigín released her first album on the Ceoltaí Éireann label, Songs of the Scribe. As Traditional Singer in Residence at the Seamus Heaney Centre she collaborated with poets Ciaran Carson and Seamus Heaney on editing and translating song-poems from ancient Irish manuscripts, written by Irish scribes and scribe-poets. To record the album, Pádraigín travelled to St. Gallen, Switzerland to read the Irish manuscripts that had been removed from the country for safe-keeping in the event of Viking attack. Songs of the Scribe features all new compositions for poems and marginalia in Old Irish and in English. Songs of the Scribe received a positive reception and remained on the Celtic Note album charts for seven months between March and September 2012.

The recording of Songs of the Scribe and Ní Uallacháin's visit to St. Gallen saw Ní Uallacháin begin work on a new creative album with fiddler/producer Dónal O'Connor based on older writings, including lore surrounding Irish Goddess Brigid. Pádraigín is also researching for a new book on the songs from the Irish Kingdom of Bréifne.

LET THE FAIRIES IN, Pádraigín's latest album of children's songs was released in September 2012.

She released a double album of songs, Ceoltaí Oirialla: Songs of Oriel in 2017 to coincide with the launch of the Oriel Arts Project, an online research and multimedia project which was funded by the Arts Council of Ireland.

2020–present: New Music

Pádraigín Ní Uallacháin released Beannú, a newly composed Irish blessing in August 2020 Ní Uallacháin released the song as a video on Facebook and as a digital download.

Awards
In 2003, Pádraigín was awarded Gradam Shean-nós Cois Life. Ní Uallacháin is the first traditional musician to receive a Major Arts Award from the Arts Council of Northern Ireland and the Cultural Relations Commission. in 2004. In 2018, she was awarded the Outstanding Contribution to Traditional Music Award at Gradam Ceoil TG4. Her book, A Hidden Ulster: people, songs and traditions of Oriel was a Times Literary Supplement Book of the Year  and an Irish Times Book of the Year. The book was shortlisted for the 2005 Michaelis-Jena Ratcliff Prize.

Ní Uallacháin received her doctorate from University of Ulster in 2012 and was the first Irish language Irish-language RLF Fellow of the Royal Literary Fund.

Personal life
Pádraigín lives in Glendesha, County Armagh and has two sons, Eoghan and Macdara Ó Graham, a jewellery maker and goldsmith. She is a sister of the late singer Eithne Ní Uallacháin and aunt to Eithne's sons Dónal O'Connor (a producer and member of Irish traditional group At First Light), uilleann piper Finnian Ó Conchubhair and film director Feilimí O'Connor.

Discography
1994 – A Stór Is A Stóirín (Songs for All Ages)
1995 – An Dara Craiceann (Beneath the Surface)
1997 – When I Was Young
1999 – An Irish Lullaby (Suantraí)
2002 – An Dealg Óir (The Golden Thorn)
2005 – Áilleacht (Beauty)
2011 – Songs of the Scribe
2012 – LET THE FAIRIES IN
2017 - Ceoltaí Oirialla (27 Oriel Songs)

Bibliography
2003 – Ní Uallacháin, Pádraigín, A Hidden Ulster: People, songs and traditions of Oriel, Four Courts Press

Footnotes

External links
Official website
Editor/Author Oriel music project 2018

20th-century Irish women singers
21st-century Irish women singers
Irish folk singers
Irish-language singers
Irish-language writers
Irish schoolteachers
Living people
Musicians from County Armagh
People from County Louth
Year of birth missing (living people)